Eagle One: Harrier Attack is a video game developed by Glass Ghost and published by Infogrames for the PlayStation in 2000.

Gameplay
Players assume the role of a United States Marine who pilots an AV-8B Harrier jet as well as five other aircraft including a UH-1 Huey helicopter and an A-10 Thunderbolt II. Approximately 80% of the single-player campaign is spent piloting the Harrier. The game's objective is to complete missions such as rescuing downed pilots and attacking terrorist targets. Four modes of play are available, a single-player mode, a co-operative two-player mode, a competitive two-player mode and a training mode to accustom the player to the plane's controls. The game's 25 single-player levels take place throughout the Hawaii island chain, and typically involve low-level flight below an altitude of 100 feet. The co-operative mode features 5 missions.

Plot
A group of terrorists calling themselves the Army of the New Millennium (ANM) has armed itself with Soviet weapons technology and declared war on the United States of America, with a stated aim of "freeing the world from the grasp of the American war machine." They have attacked the islands of Hawaii with their electromagnetic pulse weapon to knock out all the electrical devices on the islands. Having accomplished this, the group has moved the weapon to a Soviet aircraft carrier and intends to continue their attacks. In response, a U.S. Marine pilot is dispatched in an AV-8B Harrier in order to liberate all five Hawaiian islands in the chain.

Reception

The game received "average" reviews according to the review aggregation website GameRankings. Rick Sanchez of Next Generation called it "a well-rounded action title that will keep you glued to your game pad, even if you're not a flight-sim buff."

References

External links
 

2000 video games
Combat flight simulators
Helicopter video games
PlayStation (console) games
PlayStation (console)-only games
Video games about the United States Marine Corps
Video games developed in the United Kingdom
Video games set in Hawaii